Artz may refer to:
 Adolph Artz (1837–1890), Dutch painter
 Lena Clemmons Artz (1891–1976), American botanist
 Wouter Artz (born 1985), Dutch professional football player
 Artz Pedgregal, a shopping mall in Mexico City

See also 
 Russell Artzt